Mythimna anderreggii is a moth in the family Noctuidae. It is found in the mountains of Europe (Alps, the Apennines, Abruzzo, the Pyrenees and Balkan Peninsula). It is also present in the northern Caucasus, the Gissar Range, the Pamir mountains and the Tian Shan mountains.

The wingspan is about 27–34 mm. There is one generation per year, with adults on wing from May to October.

The larvae feed on various grasses, including Dactylis glomerata. The species overwinters in the pupal stage.

References

External links

Funet Taxonomy
Entomologenportal.de
Lepiforum.de

Moths described in 1840
Mythimna (moth)
Moths of Europe
Moths of Asia